A Satisfied Mind is a compilation of 9 of the 12 songs from the 1962 Capitol album Big Bluegrass Special plus "A Satisfied Mind" which had been released as flipside of Glen Campbell's 1966 Capitol single "Can’t You See I’m Trying".

Track listing
Side 1:

 "A Satisfied Mind" (J.H. Hayes, Jack Rhodes) – 2:01
 "Weary Lonesome Blues" (Alton Delmore) – 2:15
 "Truck Driving Man" (Terry Fell) – 2:00
 "There's More Pretty Girls Than One" (Alton Delmore, Arthur Smith) – 2:55
 "Rainin' On The Mountain" (Alton Delmore) – 2:22

Side 2:

 "One Hundred Miles Away From Home" (Jerry Capehart, Glen Campbell, Nick Venet) – 3:10
 "Kentucky Means Paradise" (Merle Travis) – 1:39
 "Lonesome Jailhouse Blues" (Alton Delmore, Rabon Delmore) – 1:32
 "Long Black Limousine" (Vern Stovall, Bobby George) – 3:00
 "Poor Boy Lookin' For A Home" (Melvin Schmidt) – 2:10

References

1971 compilation albums
Glen Campbell compilation albums
Pickwick Records compilation albums